This article presents the discography of the French pop rock singer Calogero.

Albums

Studio albums

Live albums

Compilation albums

Singles

Promotional singles

DVD

Tours

 Live 1.0

References

Discographies of French artists
Pop music discographies